Muruganpalayam is a census town in Tiruppur district in the Indian state of Tamil Nadu.

Demographics
 India census, Muruganpalayam had a population of 14,431. Males constitute 52% of the population and females 48%. Muruganpalayam has an average literacy rate of 64%, higher than the national average of 59.5%: male literacy is 73%, and female literacy is 55%. In Muruganpalayam, 12% of the population is under 6 years of age.

References

Neighbourhoods and suburbs of Tiruppur